Frank Bolus (2 November 1864 – 15 September 1939) played first-class cricket for Somerset in 10 matches in the 1893 and 1894 seasons. He was born at Wolverhampton and died at Coventry.

Bolus was used by Somerset as a lower-order right-handed batsman, and bowled only three overs in his 10 games for the county, although he took a wicket in a non-first-class match for Somerset against the 1894 South Africans played after his last first-class match for the team. A surviving scorecard from a club match involving Frome Cricket Club suggests that at club cricket level he was regarded as an all-rounder. For Somerset, he made innings of 16 and 23 in his first game against Yorkshire. But the 23 remained his highest first-class score, although he was given seven matches in 1893 and three more in 1894, and his career batting average was only seven runs per innings.

References

1864 births
1939 deaths
English cricketers
Somerset cricketers